History and Philosophy of the Life Sciences is a quarterly peer-reviewed academic journal covering the history and philosophy of biology. It was established in 1979 and is published by Springer Science+Business Media. The editors in chief are Sabina Leonelli and Giovanni Boniolo. According to the Journal Citation Reports, the journal has a 2017 impact factor of 0.559.

References

External links

HPLS on JSTOR
HPLS on Twitter

Philosophy of science journals
Philosophy of biology
History of biology
History of science journals
Publications established in 1979
Multilingual journals
Springer Science+Business Media academic journals
Quarterly journals